Moroccan license plates match in size and appearance to a large extent the European license plates and usually show black text on a white background.

Current Series

Normal Registration Plates
Since 2000, the plates begins with a one to five-digit registration code followed by two vertical lines. In between the lines, there's an Arabic character to distinguish between series. Finally, there is a one- or two-digit regional code for the origin of the vehicle. The plates are to be black on white. Otherwise, there aren't any regulation on font shape or font size used.

The letters follow an Abjad order, but skipping certain letters that have been allocated to special vehicles, such as police and civil defense. So far, the following have been reached in Moroccan regions.

For two-line signs the letter and region code in the top line and the serial number on the bottom appear. Same applies for motorcycle plates. Older license plates show only digits after the pattern 1234-56 |أ| 7 .

Normal plates are installed on privately owned vehicles, motorcycles, taxis, public transit, trucks, trailers, and agricultural equipment. There are no exceptions or special designations.

Typical 1-line license plate, having a size compliant with that of European Union license plates, 520 x 110 mm

Typical 2-line license plate, installed on imported vehicles that can't accommodate a standard 1-line plate. 300 x 150 mm

Motorcycle 2-line license plate. 180 x 120 mm

Regional codes

The regional codes are:

 1: Rabat
 2: Salé-Médina
 3: Sala Al-Jadida
 4: Skhirat-Temara
 5: Khémisset
 6: Casablanca Anfa
 7: Casablanca Hay Mohammadi-Aïn Sebaâ
 8: Casablanca Hay Hassani
 9: Casablanca Benmsik
 10: Casablanca Moulay Rachid
 11: Casablanca-Al Fida Derb Sultan
 12: Casablanca Mechouar
 13: Casablanca Sidi Bernoussi-Zenata
 14: Mohammedia
 15: Fès jdid - dar dbibagh
 16: Fès Medina
 17: Zouagha - Moulay Yacoub
 18: Sefrou
 19: Boulmane
 20: Meknès Menzah
 21: Meknès Ismailia
 22: El Hajeb
 23: Ifrane
 24: Khénifra
 25: Errachidia
 26: Marrakech-Menara
 27: Marrakech-Medina
 28: Marrakech-Sidi Youssef Ben-Ali
 29: El-Haouz
 30: Chichaoua
 31: Kelâat Es-Sraghna
 32: Essaouira
 33: Agadir Ida-Outanane
 34: Agadir - Inezgane - Ait Melloul
 35: Chtouka Aït Baha
 36: Taroudant
 37: Tiznit
 38: Ouarzazate
 39: Zagora
 40: Tangier - Asilah
 41: Tanger Fahs-Bni Makada
 42: Larache
 43: Chefchaouen
 44: Tétouan
 45: Al-Hoceima
 46: Taza
 47: Taounate
 48: Oujda
 49: Berkane
 50: Nador
 51: Taourirt
 52: Jerada
 53: Figuig
 54: Asfi
 55: El Jadida
 56: Settat
 57: Khouribga
 58: Benslimane
 59: Kénitra
 60: Sidi Kacem
 61: Béni Mellal
 62: Azilal
 63: Smara
 64: Guelmim
 65: Tan-Tan
 66: Tata
 67: Assa-Zag
 68: Laâyoune
 69: Boujdour
 70: Oued Ed-Dahab
 71: Aousserd
 72: Casablanca Ain-Chock
 73: Casablanca Nouacer
 74: Casablanca Mediouna
 75: M'diq - Fnideq
 76: Driouch
 77: Guercif
 78: Ouazzane
 79: Sidi Slimane
 80: Midelt
 81: Berrechid
 82: Sidi Bennour
 83: Ben Guerir
 84: Fquih Ben Salah
 85: Youssoufia
 86: Tinghir
 87: Sidi Ifni
 88: Tarfaya
 89: Lagouira

Trailer Plates

Semi-trailers heavier than a Gross weight of 750 kg are allocated two plates. They are allocated a normal plate, as previously discussed, as well as a special plate. This plate is white on red, and follows a format of [#### - ##].

Temporary Plates
There are two temporary plates, the "W18" format and the "WW" format.

Vehicles that are still owned by the dealership, or are being tested, and are not sold yet, are assigned a "W18" format plate. These plates are issued nationally, and do not correspond to the previously mentioned regional codes. "W18" plates are red on white, and follow the format [##### W 18].

Newly purchased vehicles in Morocco are assigned temporary sticker tags ending with the letters "WW" for two months until a permanent registration plate is assigned. These plates are issued nationally, and do not correspond to the previously mentioned regional codes. "WW" plates are black on white, and follow the format [###### WW].

Diplomatic Plates
Moroccan diplomatic license plates have a yellow background and show in the left margin the letters "CD" for Corps Diplomatique and "Maroc". The other side of the plate shows "هـ د" and""المغرب"in Arabic script."هـ د" stands for "هيئة دبلوماسية", meaning Diplomatic Corps. Between these two blocks, two pairs of numbers appear, the latter indicating the country of origin.

International Cooperative Plates

"International Cooperative" is defined as international organizations such as the UN, or the African Union. Moroccan International cooperative license plates have a yellow background and show in the left margin the letters "CI" for Coopération Internationale and "Maroc". The other side of the plate shows "ت د" and""المغرب"in Arabic script."ت د" stands for "تعاونية الدولية", meaning international Cooperative. Between these two blocks, two pairs of numbers appear.

State-owned Civilian Vehicles

State-owned civilian vehicles are designated their own format of license plates. These license plates are white on black and consist of 6-digits. They also have a designating letter ج (Latin equivalent being J) in red, on a white background.

'Typical 1-line license plate, having a size complaint with that of European Union license plates, 520 x 110 mmTypical 2-line license plate, installed on imported vehicles that can't accommodate a standard 1-line plate. 300 x 150 mmCivil Protection Plates
Civil Protection vehicles, such as ambulances and fire trucks, are designated their own format of license plates. These license plates are black on white  and consist of 6-digits. They also have a designating letters و م (Latin equivalent being  W M) in red, on a white background. These Arabic letters stand for "الوقاية المدنية" meaning Civil Protection.Typical 1-line license plate, having a size complaint with that of European Union license plates, 520 x 110 mmTypical 2-line license plate, installed on imported vehicles that can't accommodate a standard 1-line plate. 300 x 150 mmPolice Vehicles

Police vehicles are designated their own format of license plates. These license plates are white on black and consist of 6-digits. They also have a designating letter ش (Latin equivalent being Š/Sh) in red, on a white background. This letter stands for "الشرطة" meaning Police.Typical 1-line license plate, having a size complaint with that of European Union license plates, 520 x 110 mmTypical 2-line license plate, installed on imported vehicles that can't accommodate a standard 1-line plate. 300 x 150 mmAuxiliary Forces Vehicles

Auxiliary Forces are an additional paramilitary force in Morocco, their vehicles are designated their own format of license plates. These license plates are white on black and consist of 6-digits. They also have a designating letter ق س (Latin equivalent being Q S) in red, on a white background. These letters stands for "القوات المساعدة‎", although it is not a perfect acronym.Typical 1-line license plate, having a size complaint with that of European Union license plates, 520 x 110 mmTypical 2-line license plate, installed on imported vehicles that can't accommodate a standard 1-line plate. 300 x 150 mmMilitary Vehicles
Vehicles belonging to the Royal Moroccan Armed Forces are designated their own format of license plates. These license plates are white on black and consist of 6-digits. On the right hand side, they have the Moroccan Flag, and on the left hand side, the Moroccan Army Insignia. They also have a designating letter ق م م (Latin equivalent being Q M M) in white o n black background. This letter stands for "القوات المسلحة المغربية" meaning Moroccan Armed Forces''.

The Navy's vehicles show the crest of their branch and have a blue background.

Gallery

References

External links

  Ministère de l'équipement, du transport et de la logistique : procédure d'immatriculation
  Ministère de l'équipement, du transport et de la logistique : Modèles de plaques d'immatriculation
  Ministère de l'équipement, du transport et de la logistique : immatriculation des séries WW et W18
  www.worldlicenseplates.com

Morocco
Road transport in Morocco